Jacob Edwin Meeker (October 7, 1878 – October 16, 1918) was a U.S. Representative from Missouri.

Background
Born near Attica, Indiana, Meeker attended the public schools. He graduated from Union Christian College, Merom, Indiana, in 1900, and from Oberlin Theological Seminary in 1904. While a student at Union Christian College he became pastor of a rural church in Vermilion County, Illinois. He was ordained as a minister in 1901 and assumed his duties in Vermilion County.

He was a missionary in Eldon, Missouri, for the Congregational Church in 1904. He moved to St. Louis, Missouri, in 1906 to take charge of the Compton Hill Congregational Church. He resigned in 1912. He studied law at Benton College of Law and was admitted to the bar in 1914.

Meeker was elected as a Republican to the Sixty-fourth and Sixty-fifth Congresses and served from March 4, 1915, until his death from Spanish flu in St. Louis, Missouri, on October 16, 1918.

He was interred in Union Cemetery, Attica, Indiana.

See also
List of United States Congress members who died in office (1900–49)

References

 Jacob E. Meeker, late a representative from Missouri, Memorial addresses delivered in the House of Representatives and Senate frontispiece 1920

1878 births
1918 deaths
American Congregationalist missionaries
Congregationalist missionaries in the United States
American Congregationalist ministers
Republican Party members of the United States House of Representatives from Missouri
Deaths from the Spanish flu pandemic in the United States
People from Fountain County, Indiana
People from Vermilion County, Illinois
19th-century American politicians
Deaths from the Spanish flu pandemic in Missouri